Nikolay Fedulov is a Soviet sprint canoer who competed in the early 1970s. He won two medals at the ICF Canoe Sprint World Championships with a silver (C-1 500 m: 1973) and a bronze (C-1 10000 m: 1970).

References

Living people
Soviet male canoeists
Year of birth missing (living people)
Russian male canoeists
ICF Canoe Sprint World Championships medalists in Canadian